Yair Pantilat (also, Pantillat; יאיר פנטילט; born January 10, 1939) is an Israeli former Olympic runner. He was the Israeli Men's Champion in the 800 metres in 1960, 1964–65, and 1967–69, and in the 1500 metres in 1961-62 and 1964-66.

He was born in Tel Aviv, Israel, and is Jewish.

Running career
His personal bests are 1:51.3 in the 800 metres (in 1967) and 3:52.4 in the 1500 metre run (in 1967). He was the Israeli Men's Champion in the 800 metres in 1960, 1964–65, and 1967–69, and in the 1500 metres in 1961-62 and 1964-66.

He competed for Israel at the 1960 Summer Olympics in Rome, Italy, in Athletics at the age of 21. In the Men's 800 metres he came in 5th in Heat 1 with a time of 1:54.7 (an Israeli record), and in the Men's 1,500 metres he came in 12th in Heat 3 with a time of 3:59.8 (an Israeli record). When he competed in the Olympics, he was 5-9.5 (177 cm) tall, and weighed 150 lbs (68 kg). He was named Israel's Sportsman of the Year in 1960.

References 

Israeli male middle-distance runners
Olympic athletes of Israel
1939 births
Athletes (track and field) at the 1960 Summer Olympics
Sportspeople from Tel Aviv
Living people